Sacco and Vanzetti is a 2006 documentary film directed by Peter Miller. Produced by Peter Miller and Editor Amy Linton, the film presents interviews with researchers and historians of the lives of Nicola Sacco and Bartolomeo Vanzetti, and their trial. It also presents forensic evidence that refutes that used by the prosecution during the trial. Prison letters written by the defendants are read by voice actors with Tony Shalhoub as Sacco and John Turturro as Vanzetti. Interviewees include Howard Zinn, Studs Terkel and Arlo Guthrie.

Sacco and Vanzetti won the 2007 John E. O'Connor Film Award, the annual prize for the best historical film awarded by the American Historical Association. It was released nationally in theaters in March 2007 and later on DVD.

See also
 Sacco e Vanzetti, a 1971 Italian film portrayal of the affair
 The Diary of Sacco and Vanzetti, a 2004 docudrama

Footnotes

External links
 Sacco and Vanzetti at Willow Pond Films official website.
 "Sacco and Vanzetti", an interview with the director on "The Barry Z Show", YouTube, April 27, 2007.
 
 

2006 films
Documentary films about anarchism
Films about miscarriage of justice
Films about activists
Works about Sacco and Vanzetti
2000s English-language films